Searsia is a genus of flowering plants in the family Anacardiaceae.

Taxonomy

Species
, Plants of the World online has 111 accepted species:

References

 
Flora of Southern Africa
Trees of Africa
Anacardiaceae genera